The Rat Pack was the nickname given to a group of young, high-profile Canadian Liberal opposition Members of Parliament during the Progressive Conservative government of Prime Minister Brian Mulroney.

Background 

The Liberal Party had suffered the worst defeat in its history in the 1984 election.  In the first years of the Mulroney government, the Liberals failed to mount an effective opposition to Mulroney, and were in danger of being overshadowed by the New Democratic Party (NDP), which had almost as many seats as the Liberals.  

In the midst of this, a group of young, energetic, and unknown Liberals soon emerged as a vocal voice of opposition to Mulroney.  They included Don Boudria of eastern Ontario, Sheila Copps of Hamilton, Brian Tobin of Newfoundland and John Nunziata of the Greater Toronto Area.  Tobin had been elected when the Liberals regained power in the 1980 election; the others had been among the few bright spots for the Liberals in the 1984 blowout. The Globe and Mail suggested  the name "Rat Pack" was originally given by "a newspaper reporter."  They played a role in ending  the career of a number of Mulroney ministers due to their vocal criticism.

Boudria, Tobin, and Copps were all appointed to Cabinet at various times during the ministry of Jean Chrétien.
Nunziata was expelled from the Liberal Party in 1996 for voting against the budget.  He then ran—and won—as an independent candidate in the 1997 federal election and then was defeated by a Liberal in 2000. Tobin left Parliament in 1996 to become leader of the Newfoundland Liberal Party; he served as that province's premier until returning to Parliament in 2000.

Under the somewhat more right-of-centre Paul Martin, who succeeded Chrétien in 2003, Copps and Boudria were relegated to the Liberal backbenches. Tobin had already left Parliament in 2002 in protest of the stranglehold on the Liberal organization by Martin's supporters.  In 2004, Copps' riding was merged with that of Martin loyalist Tony Valeri in such a way that most of the new riding's residents lived in Valeri's old riding.  Copps was narrowly defeated for renomination.  The last remaining member of the group, Boudria, did not run for reelection in 2006.

References

 "Liberals' Rat Pack aims for credibility". Bob Hepburn Toronto Star. Toronto, Ont.: October 6, 1985. pg. F.4

Liberal Party of Canada